Gilfillan is an unincorporated community in Redwood County, in the U.S. state of Minnesota.

History
Gilfillan was named for Charles Duncan Gilfillan, a local landowner, and afterward state legislator.

References

Unincorporated communities in Redwood County, Minnesota
Unincorporated communities in Minnesota